The Denmark women's national under-18 volleyball team represents Denmark in international women's volleyball competitions and friendly matches under the age 18 and it is ruled and managed by the Danish Volleyball Federation That is an affiliate of Federation of International Volleyball FIVB and also a part of European Volleyball Confederation CEV.

Results

Summer Youth Olympics
 Champions   Runners up   Third place   Fourth place

FIVB U18 World Championship
 Champions   Runners up   Third place   Fourth place

Europe U18 / U17 Championship
 Champions   Runners up   Third place   Fourth place

Team

Previous squad

References

External links
Official website
FIVB profile

National women's under-18 volleyball teams
Volleyball
Volleyball in Denmark